HTTP response splitting is a form of web application vulnerability, resulting from the failure of the application or its environment to properly sanitize input values. It can be used to perform cross-site scripting attacks, cross-user defacement, web cache poisoning, and similar exploits.

The attack consists of making the server print a carriage return (CR, ASCII ) line feed (LF, ASCII ) sequence followed by content supplied by the attacker in the header section of its response, typically by including them in input fields sent to the application. Per the HTTP standard (RFC 2616), headers are separated by one CRLF and the response's headers are separated from its body by two. Therefore, the failure to remove CRs and LFs allows the attacker to set arbitrary headers, take control of the body, or break the response into two or more separate responses—hence the name.

Prevention 
The generic solution is to URL-encode strings before inclusion into HTTP headers such as Location or Set-Cookie.

Typical examples of sanitization include casting to integers or aggressive regular expression replacement. Although response splitting is not specific to PHP, the PHP interpreter contains protection against the attack since version 4.4.2 and 5.1.2.

References

External links 
 Divide and Conquer - HTTP Response Splitting, Web Cache Poisoning Attacks, and Related Topics. Amit Klein, 2004.
 Target Web Application Vulnerable to HTTP Header Injection
 HTTP Response Splitting, The Web Application Security Consortium
 Wapiti Open Source XSS, Header, SQL and LDAP injection scanner
 LWN article
 CWE-113: Failure to Sanitize CRLF Sequences in HTTP Headers ('HTTP Response Splitting')
 HTTP Response Splitting Attack - OWASP
 CRLF Injection - OWASP

Web security exploits
Hypertext Transfer Protocol headers